Georgy Sergeyevich Poltavchenko (born on 24 February 1953) is a Russian politician.

He became Governor of Saint Petersburg in 2011. On 3 October 2018, Russian President Vladimir Putin replaced him by Alexander Beglov on an interim basis until the 2019 city election. Previously, he served as the Presidential Envoy to the Central Federal District.

Life 
He was born in Azerbaijan in 1953; his father was of Ukrainian descent. He studied at Leningrad Aviation Instrument-Making Institute. After graduation he worked at Leninets Research and Production Association and at a district Komsomol (Young Communists' League) committee in Leningrad. He began service in the KGB in 1979. From 1980 to 1990, he occupied various posts in the KGB, ultimately becoming chief of department, Vyborg directorate, regional department of KGB in Leningrad and the Leningrad region. Georgy was deputy of the Leningrad Regional Council from 1990 to 1993, deputy of Leningrad Regional Council. He was then chief of St. Petersburg directorate, Federal Tax Police from 1993 to 1999. He ran for the Leningrad city council unsuccessfully in 1998. From 1999 to 2000, he was plenipotentiary representative of the Russian President to Leningrad Oblast.

Controversy

LGBT Dispute 
In March 2012, Poltavchenko drew the ire of the LGBT community in Russia after he approved a controversial law penalizing the propaganda of homosexuality. In retaliation, the LGBT community in Russia sent letters to the United States, the European Union, Australia and Canada asking them to ban entry for city officials behind the controversial gay propaganda ban.

Plagiarism 
In May 2013, according to examination of his doctoral thesis made by Dissernet, Poltavchenko was accused of plagiarism: an overwhelming part of the text had been copy-pasted from several other doctoral theses and books.

Awards 
Russian
: Order "For Merit to the Fatherland", 3rd class (2008)
: Order "For Merit to the Fatherland", 4th class (2003)
: Order of Alexander Nevsky (2013)
Dynastic orders
 Russian Imperial Family: Order of Saint Anna, 1st class (2013)

References

External links

 Bio on Georgy Poltavchenko
 Биография на сайте Президента России
 Биография на сайте customsunion.ru
 Полтавченко, Георгий в Лентапедии
 Наместник полуцарства
 Лауреаты международной премии Андрея Первозванного "За Веру и Верность" в 2003 году
 Георгий Полтавченко: В ЦФО надо строить больше малоэтажного жилья
 Персональный твиттер-аккаунт Георгия Сергеевича Полтавченко

1953 births
Living people
1st class Active State Councillors of the Russian Federation
Azerbaijani emigrants to the Soviet Union
KGB officers
Recipients of the Order "For Merit to the Fatherland", 3rd class
Recipients of the Order of Honour (Russia)
Recipients of the Order of Holy Prince Daniel of Moscow
Medvedev Administration personnel
Russian people of Ukrainian descent
Plenipotentiary Representatives of the President of the Russian Federation in the regions
Governors of Saint Petersburg